Arun G Raghavan, also known by the stage name Arun Raghav, is an Indian actor known for his works in Malayalam television. His works include Soubhagyavathi, Bharya and Pookkalam Varavayi. His breakthrough performance was playing 10 roles including a female role in the Bharya serial.

Career
Born to Raghavan and Sridevi, Arun finished his high schooling at St. Joseph School, Anandapuram and undergraduate studies at St. Thomas College, Thrissur. After completing his studies, he started working as a system engineer before taking acting as a profession.

He began his cinema career with the film Vilakkumaram (2017) which was directed by Vijay Menon. He was a part of the Malayalam short film Blade. Later he acted in hit serials like Soubhagyavathi, Bharya, Sthreepadham  and Pookkalam Varavayi.

Television

References

External links

Living people
Male actors in Malayalam television
St. Thomas College, Thrissur alumni
Year of birth missing (living people)